LexiCon Gaming Convention is a tabletop board game focused convention in Lexington, KY, held every spring at the Clarion Hotel and Convention Center.  LexiCon features a game library of over 2,000 titles, provided by LexiCon founders, convention supporters, local board game groups and the convention itself.

LexiCon is notable for the large number of events it hosts relative to its size and regional nature. These events include Learn-to-Play activities, tournaments, RPG events, Cosplay demonstrations and parties in addition to scheduled and unscheduled individual games.  In addition to these events, an exhibit hall with vendors and exhibitors is available to attendees as well as the general public.

LexiCon was founded in 2013 by Chris Grzywacz, Philip Holland and Greg Franseth, all Lexington natives, after Grzywacz and Holland attended GenCon for the first time.  Lexington had previously been home to other gaming conventions, most notably Forge, however none had lasted.  Grzywacz stated his intention from the beginning that LexiCon be a permanent fixture in the Lexington community, and the others agreed that there was an untapped demand out there that they could meet.  Lexicon Gaming, LLC was officially formed in October 2013, and the date of the inaugural Lexicon Gaming Convention set for May 2–4, 2014.

LexiCon is currently managed by Chris Grzywacz, Greg Franseth, Rob Slevin, and Larry Estep.  They started a new convention, CinCityCon Boardgaming and RPG Convention in Cincinnati in Oct. of 2018 at the Sharonville Convention Center.  This convention shares many characteristics of LexiCon but has grown larger than LexiCon by its second year.

LexiCon 2014 

LexiCon 2014 was the first year for LexiCon Gaming Convention. The convention itself reported the following statistics for that year:

 7 International Releases for new games
 25+ Cosplayers
 30 Vendors
 32 players in the Catan Tournament
 41 totally awesome volunteers and gamemasters
 48 RPG players
 50 players in our giant Werewolf game
 53 straight hours of gaming
 65 attendees at our Saturday party
 81 different scheduled events
 100+ Games given away
 300+ dollars raised for Big Brothers Big Sisters of the Bluegrass
 400+ attendees
 500+ dollars awarded in miniatures prizes
 1027 Games in the Library

LexiCon 2014 included several unusual or unique events. In 2014 introduced SmashUp!: The Beat a Little Girl edition.  While potentially upsetting in its title, the event is actually a challenge from one of Grzywacz's daughters, a notoriously excellent game player, to every convention attendee.  Only one player was able to win out over her.  Unlike other regional conventions which often include an off-site party at a local bar or tavern, Lexicon hosted a Saturday night party onsite.  This party became infamous for the impromptu lap dance of a male attendee for convention founder Grzywacz.  The party also included a 50+ person Werewolf game, a 30+ (very adult) person Say Anything game as well as numerous plays of Cards Against Humanity and Crap or Slap.  Finally, Lexicon introduced an original game (Lexicon: The Game) as a fundraiser as part of its charity efforts.

Some of the many other events at Lexicon 2014 included a Magic: The Gathering tournament, a math trade, a flea market, many Pathfinder RPG campaign events, Warhammer 40K and Fantasy tournaments, War Machine demos, HeroClix tournament, Ticket to Ride tournament, DC Deck Building Game tournament, a Cosplay Contest, Learn 5 Family Games in 90 Minutes, and a Children's Game area.

Holland, Grzywacz and Franseth also worked to keep the tone of the convention light and fun.  Each day featured a different theme for the convention organizers.  Day 1 was Pirates, Day 2 was Mad Scientists, and Day 3 was Engineers.  Convention attendees were encouraged and welcomed to come in costume.  Other costumes included characters from Death Note and Adventure Time as well as original costumes out of fantasy, sci-fi and steampunk universes.

LexiCon set as a goal to be open to all attendees and to ensure an environment that was friendly to everyone.  Because other conventions have struggled with creating welcoming environments, Greg discussed this topic along with others on the Rad Ass Bitches podcast.

LexiCon 2015 

LexiCon 2015 occurred April 17–19, 2015.  LexiCon 2015 had originally been scheduled for May in 2014 to avoid conflicting with race season at Keeneland Horse Track, a major draw for Lexington, Ky.  However, the organizers determined that this was less inconvenient than the May date of 2014 had been which coincided with exams at local universities and the Kentucky Derby.  The trade-off is more limited hotel space.

Kickstarter was introduced as a funding mechanism in 2015.  Convention backers provided over $6000 in support thus ensuring that events could be planned longer in advance and that the convention could expand to include more interesting convention items like custom dice and drinking glasses.  Other funding innovations included the introduction of packages that entitled the purchaser to obtain a hotel room with events and enhancements along with their badge.

Events at LexiCon 2015 were similar to and expanded on 2014 with several notable changes.  The Exhibit Hall was doubled in size.  Exhibitors included FLGS (Friendly Local Game Stores) from Lexington (The Rusty Scabbard), Louisville (The Louisville Game Shop), Frankfort (Moonlite Comics), Richmond (Cosmic Oasis) and Cincinnati ; game publishers; artisans (e.g., Bardic Kitty) and craftspeople; CCG dealers; and numerous others.  This expansion was in response to the early sell out of the Hall in 2014.  One of the most popular exhibitors was local coffee company and convention sponsor, Magic Beans Coffee Roasters, whose presence was so well received they are expected to return in 2016.

A second party was added, so there were formal events both Friday and Saturday nights.  The Catan Tournament was elevated to a Regional Qualifier with lead in events at West 6th Brewing Company and The Rusty Scabbard Harmony Lodge (Hall) Cincinnati (hosted by Cincinnati Geek Meet), and in Louisville hosted by local gamers there.

A major LARP event, Vampire: The Masquerade, was also added; and Artemis: Spaceship Bridge Simulator was brought in by Gaming Nomads.
Attendance badges were changed for 2015.  After choosing to change directions in the company which provides registration, Lexicon dropped separate fees for all Learn-to-Play and Scheduled individual game events.  Badge holders were able to participate in those events without a separate event ticket and fee.  LexiCon also introduced a VIP badge with numerous amenities such as access to the VIP room.

In the end 2015, saw an unanticipated 42% rise in attendance with unique attendance of 521 and turnstile attendance of 1080.  Even Friday's early attendance exceeded 300.  This attendance included attendees from Kentucky, Ohio, Tennessee, Virginia, Indiana, Illinois, Missouri, West Virginia, Michigan, Georgia, Alabama, Pennsylvania, New York, New Jersey, North Carolina, South Carolina, Florida, Kansas, Texas, Colorado and California.  LexiCon also received international guests from Canada.

The most popular events were the Catan Tournament, the Pandemic Tournament, the King of Tokyo tournament, Greg's Trivial Breakfasts and Lunch, the evening parties, the special family and couples Learn-to-Play sessions, ARTEMIS, and the expanded RPG offerings.  In the end LexiCon 2015 had over 150 scheduled events including over 30 RPG scenarios.  The surprise visit of Dr. Who and Ghostbuster LARP hosts added additional excitement.  Attendees would have also noticed an increase in the amount of infrastructure in terms of banners and decorations from 2014 to 2015.

The significant increase in attendance and especially early registration, clearly overwhelmed the Lexicon staff, as there were some problems in registration especially early on the first day.  Other issues of concern were limited food offerings (word of mouth was that there was a dispute with the venue over food trucks that were supposed to be on hand), some organizational disruption in setting up the Vendor Hall, and conflicting times for a few events.  The organizers have already announced at a summer event ways they plan to address these issues in 2016.

A separate note is necessary for the Lexicon library.  The final tally of titles available through the library was 1,241, which remains larger than the GenCon Library.  Furthermore, a review of online discussions suggests that Lexicon's titles contain far fewer "disappointing" titles.  The library in 2015 also saw more than twice as many check outs than in 2014.

LexiCon has not traditionally focused on celebrity attendees.  So, many guests were surprised to find such notable designers there as Philip duBarry (Revolution, Fidelities, Courtier), Corey Young (Gravwell), Tom Cleaver (Valley of the Kings), and Kerry Breitenstein (Crap or Slap) at Lexicon.  In addition, popular celebrity blogger Kentucky Geek Girl was in attendance and celebrity podcaster Emery Buterbaugh of The Buterverse was hosting several major events.

LexiCon also had a special used game auction to raise money for Big Brother and Big Sisters of the Bluegrass at LexiCon 2015.  This special event came about because of an unexpected basement flood at the "Lexicon Library Storage Facility."  In the end, this auction raised over $250 for BBBS.  And as with the first year, LexiCon gave out more than 100 games as prizes throughout the convention.

LexiCon 2016 

LexiCon 2016 has been announced for April 22-24th at the Clarion Convention Center in Lexington, Ky and will once again be sponsored by West 6th Brewing Company and Roosters Wings.  A Kickstarter campaign will occur in October and pre-registration is expected to open in early December.  Due to the huge popularity of Lexicon 2015, the organizers are prepared to introduce a cap on attendance if pre-registration grows at a similar rate for 2016.

Some events already announced for the 2016 schedule include:
 Settlers of Catan National Qualifying Tournament and Regional feeder events
 Two (2) Pandemic Tournaments
 King of Tokyo Tournament
 Marvel RPG
 Dr Who LARP
 Ticket to Ride Tournament
 Apples to Apples Tournament
 Greg's Trivial Lunch and Breakfasts
 Expanded Learn to Plays and Play to Wins
Lexicon is targeting 150+ scheduled events for 2016.

Several changes have already been disclosed. Lexicon has added 10% more space in the form of special rooms.  Lexicon will provide their own secure wireless hot spot and registration staff to avoid the problems from 2015.  The Library will be moved back into the main ballroom and have double the dedicated open play space available in addition to spots throughout the convention center and hotel. The Library presently has 1,270 titles and is aiming for over 1,400 by the convention. The Vendor Hall will split the difference between the 2014 and 2015 sizes in order to accommodate more game playing space.  A radical change will be introduced for the Friday Night Party.   Learn-to-Plays are going to have a set schedule with multiple sessions of each topic available; Lexicon plans to expand the themed sessions such as Couples Games, Cooperative Games, or Deckbuilders.

Lexicon has also announced they will pay to have a wider variety of food offerings available on site. Lexicon is expected to celebrate the release of Cryptozoic's Ghostbusters game by having a Ghostbusters cosplay team on site throughout the convention.

LexiCon 2017, 2018, & 2019 
LexiCon 2017, 2018, and 2019 were held in April at the Clarion Conference Center and continued the tradition set by the previous conventions.  It was held in Lexington KY and continued to be sponsored by West Sixth Brewing and Rooster Wings.  LexiCon 2019 was highlighted by a significant expansion of the space used at the conference center.  New space was added by the conference center in the old gym after a significant remodel of the space, adding more than 7,000 square feet to the convention area.  LexiCon 2019 moved the RPG Gaming area here and added 9 more vending spaces.

LexiCon 2021 
Due to the COVID-19 pandemic, Lexicon 2020 was postponed. LexiCon 2021 will be held July 3- August 1, 2021 at the Clarion Conference Center and Hotel.  The Clarion Conference Center expanded its Conference Space by 50% in 2019.  It recently added a new hallway to help people move to the new space, without entering the pool area.  They finished the remodel of this space, which used to be a gym, and it is much nicer then it had been before the remodel.  This will allow LexiCon to expand their board gaming and RPG area significantly, by moving the RPG area into the newly expanded area.  This area was significantly remolded to reduce sound and humidity, this space new space is approximately 7,000 + square feet and can fit 15 or more round 6 foot tables and leave plenty of room for vending spaces around the outside walls.  Their "Ginormous Library" of over 2100 games will be available to play, along with various tournaments, learn-to-pays, RPGS, vendors, cosplay contests, Artemis Spaceship Bridge Simulator, parties, and other events.

Community Involvement and Charity Support 

While its founders created Lexicon with a mission to provide a unique gaming experience in the Bluegrass and surrounding regions, they also agreed that the convention needed to support wider missions as well.  These missions were identified to be two-fold: supporting the local community and supporting a charitable partner.

LexiCon has indicated that they seek to work with local partners in Lexington, in Kentucky and in neighboring states whenever possible.  This includes ensuring access to local game companies such as Twilight Creations and Eagle Gryphon Games.  In addition they work with local gaming shops like The Rusty Scabbard and D20, along with local businesses like West Sixth Brewing and Roosters Wings.  More directly, these partnerships mean tying local businesses to the events in the convention.  Thus Lexicon seeks to link each major event with a sponsor and to solicit sponsorships and partnerships from local businesses.

Lexicon supports charities including Big Brothers and Big Sisters of the Bluegrass.

References

External links
Photos from Lexicon 2015

Conventions in Kentucky
April events
Gaming conventions